Malabon, officially the City of Malabon, is a 1st class highly urbanized city in the National Capital Region of the Philippines. According to the 2020 census, it has a population of 380,522 people.

Located just north of the city of Manila, it is primarily a residential and industrial area, and is one of the most densely populated cities in the metropolis. It has a total land area of 15.96 square kilometers.

Malabon is part of the sub-region of Metro Manila informally called CAMANAVA, an area which derives its name from the first syllable of its component cities: Caloocan, Malabon, Navotas, and Valenzuela. Caloocan lies to the south and east, Navotas to the west, and Valenzuela to the north. Malabon also borders the town of Obando in the province of Bulacan to the northwest.

History 
Legend considers the city's name to be a contraction of the Tagalog phrase maráming labóng ("plenty of bamboo shoots"), as the place once abounded in this edible root. Originally called Tambobong (tambúbong, a rural Tagalog word for barn), Malabon was founded as a visita (hamlet) of Tondo by the Augustinians on May 21, 1599. It remained under the administrative jurisdiction of the Province of Tondo (renamed to Manila in 1859) from 1627 to 1901.

Malabon played an important economic role in the late 19th century with the founding of La Princesa Tabacalera tobacco company in 1851 and the Malabon Sugar Company in 1878. La Princesa was under the corporate umbrella of Compañia General de Tabacos de Filipinas (owned by the Spanish Crown), while the latter pioneered the refined sugar industry in the Philippines.

The newspaper La Independencia was first printed in Malabon's Asilo de Huérfanos (Orphanage), where children orphaned by the Plague of 1882 were housed.

Malabon was officially made a municipality of the newly created Province of Rizal on June 11, 1901, by virtue of Philippine Commission Act No. 137. When Act No. 942 was promulgated, Malabon was united with Navotas under a new government. On January 16, 1906, Act No. 1442 partitioned Navotas from Malabon into two separate municipalities of Rizal. The first Mayor of Malabon was Don Agustín Salamante, a Spanish mestizo originally from Cavite. The first Filipino Mayor of Malabon was Don Vicente P. Villongco. This was in 1899 at the onset of the American regime. From 1942 to 1944, Malabon was one of the municipalities of Rizal merged alongside Manila to form the City of Greater Manila as an emergency measure by President Manuel L. Quezon.

Malabon remained a municipality of Rizal until November 7, 1975, by virtue of Presidential Decree No. 824, when Malabon became a part of the National Capital Region or Metro Manila.

Cityhood 

Malabon became a highly urbanized city on April 21, 2001, under Republic Act No. 9019, 407 years after its founding.

Geography 
Malabon is one of the most densely populated cities in the Philippines and its low-lying, flat terrain makes it prone to frequent flooding, especially during high tides, heavy rains and when river and dams overflow. The four cities in CAMANAVA are commonly affected by interconnected rivers, one of which is the Tullahan River.

The river system used to be navigable and fishing was the major livelihood activity in the area. The river used to be wider and deeper with better quality water, and was a regular source of different species of fish, an important food source for local residents. Also, trees and crops like palay (rice) and vegetables used to be grown along the riverbanks. However, these agricultural plots have been replaced by industrial yards, which also became home to thousands of informal settlers who built makeshift dwellings without legal claim to the land.

Floods have worsened in recent years, occurring more frequently and reaching depths of several feet. Most affected are families in the communities that are along or near the riverbanks. The river has become narrower and shallower over the years, and its capacity to hold water has decreased. With more frequent intense rains, the riverbanks flood regularly and flooding reaches farther into low-lying and densely populated areas of the city.

Climate

Barangays 

Before the present-day Malabon, the town was originally composed of sitios (barangay) and others were further divided into two or more purok (zone).

Malabon is divided into 21 barangays.

Demographics

Religion 

Malabon belongs to the Roman Catholic Diocese of Kalookan under the episcopal seat of Bishop Pablo Virgilio David. Almost 80% of the people here adhere to this religion. Today there are eight Roman Catholic Parishes in Malabon.

Malabon bears the old images of San Bartolome in the Poblacion and the La Inmaculada Concepcion, canonically crowned since 1986 during the pontificate of Pope John Paul II.

Other religions in Malabon include Iglesia Filipina Independiente (belongs to the Diocese of Rizal and Pampanga, Parish of La Purisima Concepcion de Malabon), Baptists, Jesus the Living Stone International Assembly of God, Iglesia ni Cristo or Church of Christ, Members of the Church of God International, Jesus Is Lord Church, IEMELIF and Seventh-day Adventist.

Economy 

Malabon industries include sugar refinery, patis- (fish sauce) making, cigar-making, candle production, fishing and ilang-ilang flower-extract production (the distilled perfume is exported).

Government

City hall 
On April 21, 2008, Malabon's newly constructed 11-story city hall building along F. Sevilla Blvd. in Barangay San Agustin, was inaugurated by Gloria Macapagal Arroyo on Malabon's 7th City anniversary. It was dubbed as a "potential business center of the city," a one-stop shop for government transactions, due to its state-of-the-art facilities such as 3 high-speed elevators and the new city hall building and its offices' "digital system."

Tourism 
The Malabon City Tourism Office launched the Malabon Tricycle Tours in December 2014. The tours take visitors to eight heritage sites including the newly renovated 400-year-old San Bartolome Church as well as to notable heritage houses like the Raymundo House and Ibaviosa House.

On March 14, 2015, the tours started to offer visitors a unique gastronomic experience through visits to the city's home-based eateries. This culinary aspect was the brainchild of current Mayor Antolin Oreta III's wife Melissa Oreta, the next mayor of Malabon.

The Malabon Zoo and Aquarium, located in Potrero, is a small zoo that features an array of caged animals, along with an aquarium and gardens.

Culture 

The city is considered as the local Venice, due to year-long floods and gradual sinking. The City of Malabon is a place famous for its Pancit Malabon and its predominantly Atlantic ambience. It is also famous for other variety of foods (kakanin), such as puto sulot, puto bumbong, sapin-sapin, broas, bibingka and camachile. The culinary delights are abundant in its specialty eateries.

Its most famous festival is the "Pagoda-Caracol", a fluvial procession with street dancing to commemorate the Feast of the Immaculate Conception every December 8.

Heritage houses 
Malabon houses several old homes of historical value: the Dionisio family home, the Rivera house, the Villongco house, the Luna house, the Pascual house, the Chikiamco house, the Rojas-Borja house, the (Teodoro) Luna house, the Santos-Lapus house, the Pantaleon Bautista house, the Syjuco (formerly Gaza) house, and the Raymundo house, considered to be the oldest located along C. Arellano Street. Other old but well-preserved heritage houses in Malabon include the Asilo de Huérfanos, the Paez House, and the Nepomuceno House.

Transportation 

There are various modes of transportation that people use to go in and out of the city and to the barangays.

Jeepney Routes 
Malabon (Hulo) via Acacia Monumento (LRT/Wise) – it traverses the entire length of Gov. Pascual Ave. from Potero to Concepcion, and Gen. Luna St. from Concepcion to Hulong-Duhat. From Monumento, prominent loading/unloading stations are Tuazon, Del Monte, University Ave., Marcelo, Plastikan, Goldendale, Palengke (Acacia-Tinajeros), Robinsons Town Mall Malabon/Francis, Catmon, Gulayan, Niugan, BNR (Muzon), Santo Rosario Village, Arellano University, Concepcion, Ilang-ilang to Javier (Baritan), Celia (Bayan-bayanan), Hulong-Duhat Plaza Terminal. From Hulo, the jeepney takes M. Naval St., right to A. Bonifacio St., left to C. Arellano St. (one way southbound), left to Kalahi St. (before Burgos), left to Gen. Luna St. (one way northbound), and then right back to Gov. Pascual Avenue until it gets to either LRT Victory Mall terminal or Wise terminal in Monumento.
Malabon (Bayan) via Letre Monumento – it traverses Samson Road in Caloocan,  C-4 Road (Longos), P. Aquino Ave. and Rizal Avenue. From Monumento, as it passes the city of Caloocan, loading/unloading stations within Malabon are: Paradise, Letre/MC, Tonsuya, Magsaysay St. and Bayan terminal. To go back, jeeps turn right to Gen. Luna St., left to Sacristia St. (Behind St. James Academy), left to F. Sevilla Blvd. around Malabon City Hall back to Rizal Avenue until it gets to Monumento.
Malabon (Hulo) via Bayan Navotas – it traverses C. Arellano St. (Malabon), M. Naval St. (Navotas) and Gov. Pascual St. (Navotas). From Hulo, prominent destinations within Malabon are: Badeo Cuatro, Concepcion, Burgos, Camus, Bayan/Palengke then it enters the streets of Navotas traversing M. Naval St. northbound and Gov. Pascual St. southbound.
Gasak (Hulo) via Agora Ilaya/Divisoria – it traverses C. Arellano St., Leoño St. (Tañong), C-4 Road (Tañong), NBBN Road (Navotas), NBBS Road, Honorio Lopez Blvd. (Manila), Juan Luna St. and Nicolas Zamora St.
Gasak (Hulo) Recto – from Hulo, it traverses C. Arellano St., Rizal Avenue, P. Aquino Ave., Letre Road, Dagat-dagatan Avenue then it enters the city of Caloocan until it gets to Recto, Manila.
Sangandaan via Tatawid Polo – it traverses M.H. del Pilar St. from Sangandaan (Caloocan) to Polo (Valenzuela). This route does not begin nor end in Malabon but it serves the people of Malabon from barangay Tugatog, Tinajeros, Maysilo and Tatawid (Santulan).
Monumento via Tatawid Polo – it traverses Gov. Pascual Ave., then turn right to M.H. del Pilar St. until it gets to Polo (Valenzuela) and back.

Ferry terminals which uses boats include the Badeo Cuatro, connecting Flores to San Roque, Navotas; and Badeo Tres, connecting Concepcion to Daanghari, Navotas.

Education

Tertiary level 
The De La Salle Araneta University is the seventh campus of De La Salle Philippines. It was formerly known as the Gregorio Araneta University Foundation which was established in 1946 as the Araneta Institute of Agriculture in Bulacan, then transferred to Malabon the year after. In 1978 it was renamed as the Gregorio Araneta University Foundation. Integration of the university to the DLS System started since 1987 and in 2002 became an official member of the system. The university specializes in Veterinary Medicine and Agricultural Sciences.
 As an agricultural University – Salikneta Farm (formerly known as Saliksik-Araneta) located at the City of San Jose Del Monte, Bulacan. Its total land area is 64 hectares of farmland originally owned by Gregorio Araneta University Foundation. The wide farmland is used for forestry and agricultural operations for student training purposes. Aside from serving as a laboratory and research facility, an agricultural-forestry-ecology-tourism-integrated farm complete with recreational facilities such as horse back riding, carabao cart-pulling for passengers, fishing, camping, mini-zoo and conference area is envisioned in Salikneta.
 Arellano University-Jose Rizal Campus and Elisa Esguerra Campus, established in 1950, is the fifth campus of Arellano University.
 The City of Malabon University (CMU) is the city university. It is located in Longos, Malabon.
 There are also TESDA-accredited schools in the city. It includes the City of Malabon Polytechnic Institute

Secondary schools 
 Malabon National High School or MNHS is the pilot secondary school and the most populous school in the city. The school offers three curriculum: Engineering and Science Education Program (ESEP; popularly known as Special Science Class or SSC), Special Program in the Arts (SPA) and the K-to-12 Education Curriulum.
 There are other twelve public secondary schools in Malabon namely the Malabon National High School and Malabon National High School-Concepcion Voc-Tech Annex, Tinajeros National High School and Tinajeros National High School-Acacia Annex, Catmon Integrated School, Col. Ramon Camus Integrated School, Longos National High School, Panghulo National High School, Potrero National High School, Tañong Integrated School, Tañong National High School and Tugatog National High School.
 There are also a number of private schools in Malabon area such as St. James Academy, Immaculate Conception Parochial School, St. Therese of the Child Jesus Academy, to name a few.

Notable people 

The city of Malabon is home for famous personalities in different sectors including businessmen, celebrities, corrupt politicians, among others.

Arts, science, and academia 
Benedicto Cabrera – Filipino painter, awarded National Artist of the Philippines
Linda Ty Casper – Writer, recipient of S.E.A. Write Award.
Ernesto Domingo – National Scientist of the Philippines for Internal Medicine/ Gastroenterology
Epifanio de los Santos – Historian and hero
Erwin Mallari – Filipino watercolor artist
Ismael Mallari – Literary and art critic in the Philippines
Nonoy Marcelo – Cartoonist
CJ de Silva – Known as a "Gifted Child" and a "Promil Kid"
José Zabala-Santos – Filipino cartoonist
Ildefonso Santos – renowned poet, educator, one of the earlier translator of Lupang Hinirang
Ildefonso P. Santos Jr. – pioneer in Philippine landscape architecture, awarded National Artist of the Philippines
Armida Siguion-Reyna – Filipina singer, film and stage actress, producer and television show host

Government, politics and society 

Teresa Aquino-Oreta –  Former chairperson of the Senate Committee on Education, Arts and Culture in the 11th Congress.
 Benjamin de Jesus-  Vicar Apostolic of Jolo from 1992 until his murder in 1997.
Rafael Crame – Chief of Philippine Constabulary
Epifanio de los Santos – Historian and hero
Loren Legarda – Filipino senator and environmentalist
Janet Lim-Napoles – Businesswoman who is believed to have masterminded the Priority Development Assistance Fund (PDAF) Scam making Malabon a corrupt city
Gregorio Sanciangco – Filipino lawyer and early advocate of economic reforms in the Philippines
Rolando Santos – bishop of the Roman Catholic Diocese of Alotau-Sideia in Papua New Guinea
Antolin Oreta III-former Mayor (2012-2022)
Jeannie Ng-Sandoval-Incumbent Mayor
Canuto "Tito" Oreta- former Mayor (2004-2012)
Federico "Ricky" Sandoval II-former Representative

Sports and athletics 

Jimmy Mariano – Former Olympian and professional basketball player
Tom Ong – Athlete who competed at the 1972 Summer Olympics and 1976 Summer Olympics

Sister cities

Local 
 Navotas, Metro Manila
 Parañaque, Metro Manila
 Quezon City, Metro Manila
 Caloocan, Metro Manila

References

External links 

 
 [ Philippine Standard Geographic Code]
 

 
Cities in Metro Manila
Populated places established in 1599
1599 establishments in the Philippines
Highly urbanized cities in the Philippines